Charlie Whitehead (18 May 1899 – 16 November 1972) was an Australian rules footballer who played with St Kilda in the Victorian Football League (VFL) and Sturt in the South Australian National Football League (SANFL).

Football

Sturt (SAFL/SANFL)
Whitehead played at Sturt with his brother Reg and they were both followers in the 1926 premiership winning team. He was club captain in the 1928 season.

A ruckman, Whitehead kicked 16 goals from the 11 interstate games which he played for South Australia, including matches at the 1927 Melbourne Carnival and 1930 Adelaide Carnival.

St Kilda (VFL)
In 1932 he returned to Melbourne to spend a season with St Kilda, but resigned in early August, citing his dissatisfaction at having been demoted to the reserves.

Sturt (SANFL)
He finished his career back at Sturt, where he played for two more years.

See also
 1927 Melbourne Carnival

Footnotes

1899 births
1972 deaths
Australian rules footballers from South Australia
Australian Rules footballers: place kick exponents
St Kilda Football Club players
Sturt Football Club players